Where the Action Is is the thirteenth studio album by The Waterboys, released by Cooking Vinyl on 24 May 2019. It reached No. 21 on the UK Albums Chart and No. 3 on the UK Independent Albums Chart.

Where the Action Is was announced in March 2019, with a lyric video for "Right Side of Heartbreak (Wrong Side of Love)" released the same month. It was followed by music videos for the title track in April and "Ladbroke Grove Symphony" in May. The title track was inspired by the Robert Parker song "Let's Go Baby".

Reception

Upon release, Timothy Monger of AllMusic felt the album "continued [Scott's] unexpected dalliance with dance and hip-hop-influenced rhythms" like the preceding Out of All This Blue album, but while "also delivering the more straightforward rock bangers and folk-infused introspections that are his bread and butter". He concluded: "Where the Action Is is another reliably interesting and well-written addition to the band's latter-day renewal." Alan O'Hare of The Skinny considered the album to be one of the Waterboys' "best for a while" which "moves the listener in every way a person can be moved".

Guy Oddy of The Arts Desk concluded: "Scott may no longer be the young man who gave us "Don't Bang the Drum" and "A Girl Called Johnny" but he is far from being a Bono-like pompous windbag and on this evidence, he's not only not finished, but he may yet achieve the same mythic status of some of his own great influences." Zara Hedderman of The Irish Times felt the album "fails to inspire" and "already sounds dated", but noted the Waterboys' "familiar charm" on "In My Time On Earth".

Track listing

Charts

References

2019 albums
The Waterboys albums
Cooking Vinyl albums